Janine Lawler (born 16 August 1965) is a British sprint canoer who competed in the mid to late 1980s. Competing in two Summer Olympics, she earned her best finish of seventh in the K-4 500 m event.

References
Sports-Reference.com profile

1965 births
Canoeists at the 1984 Summer Olympics
Canoeists at the 1988 Summer Olympics
Living people
Olympic canoeists of Great Britain
British female canoeists